The Waterfront Connection allows NJ Transit trains to switch from the former Pennsylvania Railroad main line (now the Newark Division) to the former Delaware, Lackawanna and Western Railroad main line (now the Hoboken Division). The connection opened on September 9, 1991, at a cost of $16 million.

The connection consists of a single track that splits from the Northeast Corridor main line to New York Penn Station as it rises to go over the main Hoboken Division line to Hoboken. The connection rises to the east with a bridge over PATH's westbound track and a Conrail freight line, merging into the Hoboken line from the south.  The red through-girder bridge here was built for it; for its first 10+ years it was not electrified.  The Waterfront Connection lies immediately south of the Kearny Connection, and serves the complementary purpose.  The two connections allow any trains originating from the west of Kearny, regardless of line, to terminate at either Hoboken or New York Penn Station.

Most revenue trains which travel over the Connection originate on the North Jersey Coast Line, with five rush hour trains in each direction originating/terminating at Hoboken.  One morning train from the Raritan Valley Line also uses the connection to reach Hoboken. The Waterfront Connection allows diesel trains to operate direct from Hoboken to Bay Head, the last stop on the North Jersey Coast Line. Since the North Jersey Coast Line's electrification ends at Long Branch, rush hour passengers south of Long Branch can take diesel trains all the way to Hoboken or change at Newark Penn Station for service to New York City. As of 2015, the ALP-45DP has allowed the introduction of one-seat rides from New York Penn Station all the way to Bay Head.

With the advent of the Waterfront Connection, NJ Transit no longer needed a separate fueling facility on the diesel portion of the North Jersey Coast Line since diesel engines can make the trip directly to Hoboken. Faced with large opposition from Bay Head residents in 2002, the Bay Head fueling facility was shut down and trains now refuel exclusively at Hoboken or at Raritan Yard.

References

NJ Transit Rail Operations
Rail junctions in the United States